Nick Kwiatkoski (born May 26, 1993) is an American football linebacker for the Atlanta Falcons of the National Football League (NFL). He played college football at West Virginia. He was drafted by the Chicago Bears in the fourth round (113th overall) of the 2016 NFL Draft.

High school career
Kwiatkoski attended Bethel Park High School where he played wide receiver and safety. He was also named to the 2010 Pittsburgh Post-Gazettes preseason Fabulous 22 list. He missed the first two months of his senior season with a back injury. That season, he was selected to play in the Chesapeake Bowl. He was ranked the 32nd on Rivals.com's list of Pennsylvania's post-season top 40 players.

College career
Kwiatkoski then attended West Virginia University (WVU) where he majored in multidisciplinary studies. As a freshman in 2011 he redshirted. As a redshirt freshman in 2012, he appeared in 12 games, starting one. He recorded 28 tackles and three pass break-ups. In 2013, as a redshirt sophomore, appeared in and started 10 games at the "Will" linebacker position. He recorded a team-leading 86 tackles, 6.5 tackles-for-loss, two sacks, two forced fumbles and tied for second on the team with three interceptions. For the season, he was named Second-team All-Big 12 by Phil Steele. He also finished sixth in the Big 12 and 30th in the nation in solo tackles with 54. IN addition, ranked fifth in the conference in total tackles.

In 2014 as a redshirt junior, Kwiatkoski started all 13 games. He led the team with 103 tackles while simultaneously leading with 71 solo tackles. In addition, he was the team leader in tackles-for-loss with 11.5. He also recorded an assisted sack and four pass-breakups. For the season, he ranked fifth in the Big 12 in solo tackles, tied for ninth in the Big 12 in total tackles and for 12th in the conference in tackles-for-loss. As a redshirt senior in 2015, he appeared in all 13 games. He recorded 86 tackles, 10 tackles-for-loss, three interceptions and one forced fumble.

College statistics

Professional career
On December 1, 2015, it was announced that Kwiatkoski had accepted his invitation to play in the 2016 Senior Bowl. On January 30, 2016, Kwiatkoski recorded three combined tackles as part of Dallas Cowboys' head coach Jason Garrett 's North team that lost 27–16 to the South. Kwiatkoski attended the NFL Scouting Combine in Indianapolis and completed all of the combine and positional drills. On April 1, 2016, Kwiatkoski participated at West Virginia's pro day, but opted to stand on his combine numbers and only performed positional drills. Kwiatkoski attended a single pre-draft visit with the Philadelphia Eagles. At the conclusion of the pre-draft process, Kwiatkoski was projected to be a fourth or fifth round pick by NFL draft experts and scouts. He was ranked as the 14th best outside linebacker prospect in the draft by DraftScout.com.

Chicago Bears
The Chicago Bears selected Kwiatkoski in the fourth round (113th overall) of the 2016 NFL Draft; to draft him, the Bears traded their fourth (117th overall) and sixth round picks (206th overall) to the Los Angeles Rams in order to move up. He was the 15th linebacker drafted in 2016. On May 9, 2016, the Bears signed Kwiatkoski to a four-year, $2.91 million contract that includes a signing bonus of $575,120.

Kwiatkoski started seven games during his rookie year and led the team in tackles in two games (six against the Tennessee Titans, nine against the Detroit Lions). The following year, he appeared in eleven games (starting six) as he recorded 47 tackles and two sacks. He ended the 2017 season as the third-best inside linebacker in run-stop percentage and fourth-best in pass-rush productivity according to Pro Football Focus.

He opened 2018 as the starting inside linebacker before rookie Roquan Smith took over the role. In Week 17 against the Minnesota Vikings, Kwiatkoski caught a pass from quarterback Mitchell Trubisky on a two-point conversion play dubbed "Lollipop"; it was Kwiatkoski's first reception since high school.

In Week 4 of the 2019 season against the Vikings, he started in place of an injured Smith. In the game, he recorded a team-high ten tackles and sacked quarterback Kirk Cousins once in the 16–6 win.
In Week 10 against the Detroit Lions, Kwiatkoski recorded a sack and an interception off Jeff Driskel in the 20–13 win.

Las Vegas Raiders
On March 27, 2020, Kwiatkoski signed a three-year, $21 million contract with the Las Vegas Raiders.

In Week 8 against the Cleveland Browns, Kwiatkoski forced a fumble on tight end Harrison Bryant which was recovered by the Raiders during the 16–6 win.  This was Kwiatkoski's first turnover as a Raider.
In Week 10 against the Denver Broncos, Kwiatkoski recorded his first interception as a Raider off a pass thrown by Drew Lock late in the fourth quarter to secure a 37–12 win.
In Week 12 against the Atlanta Falcons, Kwiatkoski recorded his first sack of the season on Matt Ryan during the 43–6 loss. Kwiatkowski was placed on the reserve/COVID-19 list by the Raiders on December 23, 2020.

On December 8, 2021, Kwiatkoski was placed on injured reserve.

On March 16, 2022, Kwiatkoski was released by the Raiders.

Atlanta Falcons
On May 12, 2022, Kwiatkoski signed with the Atlanta Falcons. On October 16, he made his season-debut after being inactive the first five weeks of the year, with one tackle during a 28-14 win over the San Francisco 49ers.

References

External links
 
 West Virginia Mountaineers bio
 Chicago Bears bio

1993 births
Living people
People from Bethel Park, Pennsylvania
Players of American football from Pennsylvania
Sportspeople from the Pittsburgh metropolitan area
American football linebackers
West Virginia Mountaineers football players
Chicago Bears players
Las Vegas Raiders players
Atlanta Falcons players